Dudiyev or Dudiev is an Ossetian masculine surname, its feminine counterpart is Dudiyeva or Dudieva. It may refer to
Aslan Dudiyev (born 1990), Russian football player
Milana Dudieva (born 1989), Ossetian-born Russian mixed martial artist 

Russian-language surnames
Ossetian-language surnames